Gabriele Ferrero (born 2 January 1957) is a former Italian middle-distance runner who was 6th at the 1978 European Indoor Championships.

Achievements

National titles
Ferrero won three national championships at individual senior level.

Italian Athletics Championships
800 m: 1977, 1982 (2)
Italian Athletics Indoor Championships
800 m: 1978 (1)

References

External links
 Gabriele Ferrero at Atletica trevigiana 

1957 births
Living people
Italian male middle-distance runners
Sportspeople from Treviso
Athletics competitors of Centro Sportivo Carabinieri